The Mongolic peoples are a collection of East Asian originated ethnic groups in East, North, South Asia and Eastern Europe, who speak Mongolic languages. Their ancestors are referred to as Proto-Mongols. The largest contemporary Mongolic ethnic group is the Mongols. Mongolic-speaking people, although distributed in a wide geographical area, show a high genetic affinity to each other, and display continuity with ancient Northeast Asians.

List of ethnic groups

Contemporary ethnic groups 

In addition, Mongolized Soyots live in Buryatia. Their population is 3600 people. A number of orientalists (Nanzatov, Baldaev and others) traditionally consider modern Soyots as a sub-ethnos within the Buryat people.

Ethnic groups of Mongolian origin 

A large Mongolian component took part in the ethnic formation of the Hazaras. Even in the 16th century, according to Babur, the Mongolian language was widespread among the Hazaras, and a small part of them, apparently, spoke a language close to Mongolian as early as the 19th century. The high frequency of haplogroup C2-M217 is consistent with the purported Mongolian origin of many of the Hazaras. Modern Hazaras speak the Hazaragi, one of the dialects of the Dari/Persian language.

The Mughals, descendants of the Barlas and other Mongol tribes, currently speak Urdu.

Historical ethnic groups 

 Donghu
 Xianbei — founders, in the 1st century CE, of the first Mongolic empire, namely Xianbei state
 Wuhuan
 Rouran
 Yujiulü
 Duan
 Yuwen
 Kumo Xi
 Murong
 Tuyuhun
 Tuoba
 Qifu
 Tufa
 Shiwei
 Didouyu
 Khitan
 Yelü
 Zubu

General characteristics

Languages 

Languages of the Mongolic peoples belong to the Mongolic language family. The Mongolic languages are a language family spoken in Eastern Europe (Kalmykia), Central Asia, North Asia and East Asia. The best-known member of this language family, Mongolian, is the primary language of most of the residents of Mongolia and the Mongol residents of Inner Mongolia and Buryatia, with an estimated 5.7+ million speakers.

The Mongolic ethnicities possibly related to the Turkic and Tungusic peoples, whom languages together would include into the hypothetical Altaic language family.

Religions 
The Mongolic peoples are predominantly followers of Tibetan Buddhism. In 1576 the Gelug Tibetan school which was founded by the half-Mongol Je Tsongkhapa became the state religion of the Mongolia. Some groups such as Dongxiangs and Bonan people adopted Sunni Islam, as did Moghols in Afghanistan and Mughals in India. Among a part of the population, the ethnic religion, namely Tengrism (Mongolian shamanism) is preserved. A small number of Christians emerged under the influence of the Russian Church and Western missionaries.

Mongolian shamanism, more broadly called the Mongolian folk religion, or occasionally Tengerism, as refers to the animistic and shamanic indigenous religion that has been practiced in Mongolia and its surrounding areas (including Buryatia and Inner Mongolia), as well as among Daur and other peoples, at least since the age of recorded history. In the earliest known stages it was intricately tied to all other aspects of social life and to the tribal organization of Mongolian society. Along the way, it has become influenced by and mingled with Buddhism. Tengrism was transformed into a monotheistic religion only at the imperial level within aristocratic circles.

Culture 

The Culture of Mongolia has been heavily influenced by the Mongol nomadic way of life and shows similarities to other East Asian and Central Asian cultures. The various Mongolic ethnic groups share a highly similar culture and traditions, but have specific differences in clothing styles and cuisine. Although Mongolian traditional clothing (deel) has changed little since the days of the empire, there have been some changes in styles which distinguish modern Mongolian dress from historic costume. Each tribe or clan has its own deel design distinguished by cut, color, and trimming. Mongolian cuisine is primarily based on meat and dairy, with some regional variations. The most important public festivals are the Naadam. A Naadam involves horse racing, wrestling, and archery competitions. For families, the most important festival is Tsagaan Sar (Lunar New Year), which is roughly equivalent to the Chinese New Year and usually falls into January or February. Mongolia has a very old musical tradition. Key traditional elements are throat-singing, the Morin Khuur (horse head fiddle) and other string instruments, and several types of songs. Mongolian melodies are typically characterized by pentatonic harmonies and long end notes.

Genetics 
Mongols and other Mongolic-speaking groups, show high genetic affinity to each other, as well as to other East Asian populations. The analysis of 175 Mongolic samples, representing 6 ethnic groups,  incorporating results of the 1000 Genomes Project panel, revealed genetic homogeneity between different Mongolic groups, and strong affinity between North, East, and Southeast Asian populations. Furthermore, derived allele sharing between Finns and Mongolians/Siberians, suggest substantial gene flow from East Asian-related groups westwards into a population ancestral to modern Finns.

A 2014 paper investigated Mongolian geneflow into populations of Europe and South Asia, which can be mostly traced back to the time of the Mongol empire. The study analyzed the genome of a Mongolian individual from Inner Mongolia, and compared the sample to worldwide populations. The Mongolian individual showed expected high affinity to other East Asian and Native American populations. The highest affinity of the Mongolian sample was to Oroqen in Russia. A relative large amount of ancestral alleles shared with Native Americans (Maya) most likely have resulted from the Mongolians’ ancestors contribution to the peopling of the Americas. Europeans had a low, but relatively higher allele sharing with Mongolians and other East Asians, than Middle Easterners, suggesting greater impact of Mongolian geneflow towards Europeans during the Mongol Empire. Indians also show evidence of minor geneflow from Mongolians, associated with the Mughal dynasty.

A 2020 study based on ancient DNA found that West Eurasian autosomal ancestry declined significantly in Mongolia during the Mongol empire period. The authors detected a male-mediated rise in East Asian ancestry in the late medieval Mongolian period, noting also the increase in haplogroup C2b, the presumed lineage of Genghis Khan.

A 2020 study based on ancient DNA found that West Eurasian autosomal ancestry declined significantly during the Mongol empire period. The authors detected a male-mediated rise in East Asian ancestry in the late medieval Mongolian period, noting also the increase in haplogroup C2b, the presumed lineage of Genghis Khan.

A 2021 paper analyzed 42 individuals from different Mongolic sub-populations and found that all Mongolic groups have dominant East-Eurasian (East Asian-related) ancestry, specifically a Northeast Asian hunter-gatherer component (ANA, represented by DevilsCave_N or Mongolia/Baikal_N_North), and a Yellow River millet farmers component (YR_LN). A proportion of West-Eurasian-related ancestry, related to Western Steppe Herders (WSH), was found in the gene pool of modern Mongolians ranging from 5.6% to 11.6%. The admixture event was estimated to have taken place in the period ranging from Tang dynasty to Yuan dynasty.

Another 2021 paper analyzed 611 Mongolian individuals. The geographically different Mongolian populations were found to share a common genetic heritage, and also showed high affinity to acient and medieval Mongolians, suggesting genetic continuity with the Slab Grave Culture. Mongolian samples from different geographical regions have slightly different ancestry make-up: Mongolians generally have mostly dominant East Asian-related ancestry, with a strong genetic affinity to the "Ancient Northeast Asians lineage" (ANA).

A 2022 paper based on mtDNA noted that ancient Mongolians had a mixed West and East Eurasian origin, while modern Mongolians are characterized by substantially less West Eurasian ancestry. The authors suggested that most West Eurasian mtDNA haplogroups in modern Mongolians are believed to have arrived around 2,500-5,000 years ago, or the Mongolian bronze age. A smaller number arrived in the early iron age. During the medieval period, a continuous increase in East Asian mitochondrial lineages was detected, which these authors attribute to Genghis Khan's Pax Mongolica.

Notes

References

Citations

Sources

General

Genetic researches

Linguistics

Religious studies 

 
 
 
 
 
 
 
 
 

 
East Asian people
Central Asian people
People from the Russian Far East
Eastern European people
South Asian people
Nomadic groups in Eurasia
Modern nomads